Messaadine or Messaâdine is a town and commune in the Sousse Governorate, Tunisia, located four kilometres northeast of M'saken and seven kilometres southwest of Sousse, along Route RN1, a highway connecting Sousse and M'saken. Administratively part of M'saken, it had a population of 12,916 inhabitants in 2014.

History
The town is said to have been named by Abi-Said, an Ibadite living during the 13th Century of the Islamic lunar calendar

Economy
The economy of Messaadine is based mostly on the textile industry, with textile factories located in and around the city. There is also an automotive industry, with both important industry sectors relying mainly on private investments.

Culture
There is an annual arts festival in the town between July and August.

Sport
The town is known for the sporting success of its female rugby team, Club Sportif de Messaadine.

See also
List of cities in Tunisia

References

Populated places in Tunisia
Communes of Tunisia
Tunisia geography articles needing translation from French Wikipedia